Maria Laarni "Lani" Lopez Cayetano (born Maria Laarni Clariño Lopez; December 11, 1981) is a Filipina politician who is the current Mayor of Taguig from 2010 to 2019 and again since 2022. She previously served as the Representative of the 1st district of Taguig-Pateros from 2007 to 2010 and again, this time of the 2nd district, from 2019 to 2022.

She is the wife of former House Speaker and Senator Alan Peter Cayetano.

Early life
Cayetano completed a special course in Innovative and Developmental Local Governance and Policy Making for Local Chief Executives and Legislators at the University of the Philippines Diliman and a Bachelor of Arts degree in Mass Communication from Centro Escolar University.

Political career
Cayetano was 22 when she established the Progressive Ladies' League of the Philippines (PLLP), an organization that promotes women's rights and welfare. Starting with 1,300 members, PLLP now has more than 16,000 members. At the age of 23, she put up the Angat Lahat Multi-Purpose Cooperative to help people find an alternative source of income through various livelihood undertakings. She was 25 years old when she became the first female representative of Taguig-Pateros and the first of its new 1st congressional district in Congress in 2007. She succeeded her husband Alan Peter Cayetano. She also became the youngest elected President of Zonta Club of Pateros and Taguig from 2008 to 2010. For her notable achievements as a young leader, she was cited as One of the Most Distinguished Alumna of Centro Escolar University in 2008. In 2009, she earned the United Nations Associations of the Philippines recognition for her accomplishments in Politics and Government Service. She also received distinctions from other groups, including a commendation from her fellow members of Congress.

At the age of 28, Cayetano was elected as the first female Mayor of Taguig in 2010 and is among the youngest local chief executives of a highly urbanized city in the Philippines. She won in a tight race against former Supreme Court Associate Justice Dante Tiñga with a slim margin of 2,420 votes. As a result, Tiñga filed an electoral protest that would eventually be dismissed. She was reelected in 2013 and in 2016.

In March 2017, Cayetano was appointed by President Rodrigo Duterte to the Legislative-Executive Development Advisory Council (LEDAC) as Representative for Local Government Units. She used this opportunity to promote the ideals of the President.

In October 2018, Cayetano filed her Certificate of Candidacy (COC) to run for representative of Taguig's 2nd District. Her candidacy faced disqualification cases for not possessing the minimum residency qualification and she and her husband Alan, both running for representative of two separate districts of Taguig–Pateros, claimed living in separate residences as indicated on their respective COCs, which violates Article 69 of the Family Code. The case was later dismissed on May 7, 2019. On May 14, 2019, she was elected as representative of Taguig's 2nd District after defeating former councilor Che-Che Gonzales. Her brother-in-law, Lino Cayetano, was elected as her successor as Taguig's mayor after defeating outgoing Taguig–Pateros 1st district representative Arnel Cerafica. Her husband Alan Peter Cayetano was also elected as representative of Taguig–Pateros's 1st District after defeating Allan Cerafica, the outgoing representative's brother.

In 2022, Cayetano ran for Mayor of Taguig and eventually won, earning her fourth term.

Advocacies

10K Ayuda
An economic stimulus program that provides  to families, alleviating the effects of the pandemic by helping them with loan payments, purchase of daily necessities, and most especially to start/finance a small business that will sustain their livelihood. As a result, this will collectively revitalize the economy.

Regularization and Benefits for Barangay Health Workers
Since day one, barangay health workers have been denied compensation that matches their crucial role in building the foundation of every Filipino's health — from mothers’ pregnancy, babies’ vaccination, until the nutritional intake of children. Now, they have also been risking their own safety to protect their communities from COVID-19. Filing measures that will allocate funds to elevate them from volunteer status to job order, contractual, or regular government worker will justly reciprocate the time, effort, and skills they exert in maintaining our citizens’ health.

Establishment of Safe Pathways Network Of Bicycle Lanes and Slow Streets
The host of negative effects of COVID-19 in the country's health, mobility, and economy amplified the need for alternative modes of transportation that are safe and convenient. Biking to work, in particular, has offered front liners a safe transport mode that doubles as a mental break. Allocating funds for the establishment of kilometers-long, meters-wide protected bike lane network will provide these benefits to essential workers and all Filipinos during the pandemic and beyond.

References

1981 births
Bicolano people
Bicolano politicians
Lani
Centro Escolar University alumni
Duterte administration personnel
Filipino evangelicals
21st-century Filipino politicians
Living people
Mayors of Taguig
Members of the House of Representatives of the Philippines from Pateros–Taguig
Members of the House of Representatives of the Philippines from Taguig
Nacionalista Party politicians
People from Albay
Politicians from Metro Manila
Tagalog people
University of the Philippines alumni
Women mayors of places in the Philippines
Women members of the House of Representatives of the Philippines